Rafael Nadal defeated Stefanos Tsitsipas in the final, 6–2, 7–6(7–4) to win the men's singles tennis title at the 2018 Rogers Cup. It was his fourth Canadian Open title.

Alexander Zverev was the defending champion, but lost in the quarterfinals to Tsitsipas; Tsitsipas beat four top 10-ranked players en route to the final.

Seeds
The top eight seeds receive a bye into the second round.

Draw

Finals

Top half

Section 1

Section 2

Bottom half

Section 3

Section 4

Qualifying

Seeds

Qualifiers

Lucky losers

Qualifying draw

First qualifier

Second qualifier

Third qualifier

Fourth qualifier

Fifth qualifier

Sixth qualifier

Seventh qualifier

References

External links
Main draw
Qualifying draw

Men's Singles